DeAndre is a given name. Notable people with the name include:

Musicians
 DeAndre Brackensick (born 1994), an American singer from San Jose, California
 Soulja Boy (DeAndre Cortez Way; born 1990), an American rapper, record producer, actor, and entrepreneur

Sportspeople
 Deandre Ayton (born 1998), Bahamian basketball player
 Deandre Baker (born 1997), American football player
 DeAndre Brown (born 1989), American football wide receiver who is currently a free agent
 Deandre' Eiland (born 1982), American football player
 D. J. Hackett (born 1981), American football wide receiver who is currently a free agent
 DeAndre Hopkins (born 1992), American football wide receiver for the Arizona Cardinals
 De'Andre Hunter (born 1997), American basketball player
 DeAndre Jordan (born 1988), American professional basketball center with the Los Angeles Clippers
 DeAndre Kane (born 1989), American basketball player in the Israeli Premier League and EuroLeague
 DeAndre Kpana-Quamoh (1998–2016), American track and field athlete
 Deandre Latimore (born 1985), professional boxer
 DeAndre Levy (born 1987), American football linebacker for the Detroit Lions
 D. D. Lewis (linebacker b. 1979), American football linebacker who is currently a free agent
 DeAndre Liggins (born 1988), American professional basketball player with the Oklahoma City Thunder
 DeAndre McDaniel (born 1987), American football safety who is currently a free agent
 De'Andre Presley (born 1990), American football cornerback with the Miami Dolphins
 DeAndre Thompkins (born 1995), American football player
 DeAndre Wright (born 1986), American football cornerback who is currently a free agent
 DeAndre Yedlin (born 1993), American soccer player for Newcastle United.

Others
 Deandre Brunston (died 2003), 24-year-old who was shot 22 times by Los Angeles County Sheriff's deputies
 DeAndre McCullough (b. 1977 - d. August 1, 2012), a drug dealer and addict whose life at age 15 in the drug trade is portrayed in The Corner, who played bit roles in that show and in The Wire, and who briefly worked behind the scenes for Treme

See also
 D'Andre, given name
 Andre, given name